Bernd Bonwetsch (17 October 1940 – 13 October 2017) was a German historian, the founding director in 2003 of the German Historical Institute Moscow.

Early life and education
Bernd Bonwetsch was born in Berlin on 17 October 1940. From 1962 to 1967 he studied History, Slavic studies and Comparative education in Hamburg and at the Free University of Berlin. He then studied at Stanford University, 1968-69.

Career
Bonwetsch joined the History Department at University of Hamburg in 1972. From 1973 to 1980 he was assistant professor at the Department of East European History and Geography of the University of Tübingen. Bonwetsch taught from 1980 to 2003 as a professor of Eastern European history at the University of Bochum. This teaching activity was interrupted only by stays abroad in 1992 and 1993. In 1992 he was a visiting professor at the University of Innsbruck and 1993 at the Kemerovo State University. In 2000 he received an honorary doctorate from the Kemerovo State University and in 2004, he received from the Karasin National University Kharkiv another honorary doctorate.

In 2003, he was the founding director of the German Historical Institute Moscow.

Selected publications
 Kriegsallianz und Wirtschaftsinteressen. Die Stellung Rußlands in den Wirtschaftsplänen Englands und Frankreichs 1914-1917. Düsseldorf 1973 (Studien zur modernen Geschichte 10).
 Die russische Revolution 1917. Eine Sozialgeschichte von der Bauernbefreiung 1861 bis zum Oktoberumsturz. Darmstadt 1991.
 (zusammen mit Rolf Binner und Marc Junge) Massenmord und Lagerhaft: Die andere Geschichte des Großen Terrors (= Veröffentlichungen des Deutschen Historischen Instituts Moskau; Bd. 1). Akademie Verlag, Berlin 2009. ; Wladislaw Hedeler: Rezension zu Massenmord und Lagerhaft. In: H-Soz-u-Kult vom 18. Mai 2010.
 (Hg. zusammen mit Rolf Binner und Marc Junge) Stalinismus in der sowjetischen Provinz 1937–1938: Die Massenaktion aufgrund des operativen Befehls Nr. 00447 (=Veröffentlichungen des Deutschen Historischen Instituts Moskau; Bd. 2). Akademie Verlag, Berlin 2010.

References 

1940 births
2017 deaths
20th-century German historians
Free University of Berlin alumni
German Historical Institutes
People from Berlin
Academic staff of the University of Tübingen
Academic staff of Ruhr University Bochum
Historians of communism
Historians of Russia
Stanford University alumni
21st-century German historians
Academic staff of the University of Hamburg